Daphnella interrupta is a species of sea snail, a marine gastropod mollusk in the family Raphitomidae.

Description
The length of the shell attains 20 mm, its diameter 7 mm.

The protoconch contains two smooth whorls. The subsequent whorls are sculptured with unequal spiral cords, as coarse as those on the body whorl. They are densely crenulate or beaded by close fine longitudinal laminae,
much less prominent and closer than the spirals. The body whorl is densely and evenly latticed by alternately larger and smaller spiral cords intersecting scarcely less prominent, but rather closer, longitudinal rib-striae. The color of the shell is pale brown, every fourth cord marked with brown in narrow lines along the cord, alternating with diffused white spots. A row of alternately brown and white squarish spots appear below the suture: the early whorls brown. The aperture is smooth within. The outer lip is thin, regularly arcuate, rather strongly retracted above.

Distribution
This marine species occurs off the Hawaii, the Philippines, Japan and Korea.

References

 Kuroda T. (1947). Mollusca (Gastropoda, Scaphopoda and Pelecypoda). Pp.1028-1262, in Uchida K. (ed.) Illustrated Encyclopaedia of the Fauna of Japan. Revised Edition. Tokyo: Hokuryūkan.
 Severns, M. (2011). Shells of the Hawaiian Islands - The Sea Shells. Conchbooks, Hackenheim. 564 pp.

External links
 Reeve L.A. (1843-1846). Monograph of the genus Pleurotoma. In: Conchologia Iconica, vol. 1, pl. 1-40 and unpaginated text. L. Reeve & Co., London. (stated dates: pls 1-2, January 1843; pls 3-6, February 1843; pls 7-8, March 1843; pls 9-10, April 1843; pls 11-12, May 1843; pls 13-14, June 1843; pl. 15, July 1843; pl. 16, August 1843; pl. 17, November 1843; pl. 18, December 1843; pl. 19; January 1844; pls 20-26, October 1845; pls 26-27, November 1845; pls 28-33, December 1845; pls 34-38, January 1846; pls 39-40, April 1846).
 Pease, W. H. (1860). Descriptions of new species of mollusca from the Sandwich Islands (Part II). Proceedings of the Zoological Society of London. 28: 18-36, 141-148
 Pilsbry H.A. (1901). New Japanese marine, land and fresh-water Mollusca. Proceedings of the Academy of Natural Sciences of Philadelphia. 53: 385-408, pls 19-21
 Li B.-Q. [Baoquan & Li X.-Z. [Xinzheng] (2014) Report on the Raphitomidae Bellardi, 1875 (Mollusca: Gastropoda: Conoidea) from the China Seas. Journal of Natural History 48(17-18): 999-1025]
 
 Gastropods.com: Daphnella interrupta
  Kay, E. A. (1979). Hawaiian marine shells. Reef and shore fauna of Hawaii. Section 4: Mollusca. Bernice P. Bishop Museum Special Publications. 64xviii + 1-653
 Moretzsohn, Fabio, and E. Alison Kay. "HAWAIIAN MARINE MOLLUSCS." (1995)

interrupta
Gastropods described in 1860